The International Council of Onomastic Sciences (ICOS) is an international academic organization of scholars with a special interest in onomastics, the scientific study of names (e.g. place-names, personal names, and proper names of all other kinds). The official languages of ICOS are English, French, and German.

Work of the scholars of ICOS 
Members research:

 the origin and history of names, 
 the personal name-systems used by different cultures, 
 the demographic patterns of names in different societies, 
 the use and significance of names of characters in literature, 
 brand-name creation, 
 many related topics in the naming of persons, places, institutions, works of art, and other miscellaneous objects. 

They are also involved in practical projects such as the international standardization of geographical names. 

One of the aims of ICOS, unlike many national societies for name-study, is the advancement, representation and co-ordination of name-research on an international level and in an interdisciplinary context.  

To achieve this goal, it is committed to the publication of research and the development of research tools. Thus, its members come from diverse disciplines such as linguistics, philology, history, sociology, anthropology, psychology, geography and literary research.  

This organization replaced the former International Committee of Onomastic Sciences, which was composed exclusively of representatives of member countries and did not welcome individual researchers as this new structure allows.

Onoma 
ICOS publishes the annual journal Onoma, which is its official publication. Onoma is managed by a General Editor in conjunction with an Editorial Board. It contains topical research reports as well as basic theoretical articles concerning all areas of scholarly name research. ICOS also publishes an irregular newsletter.  .

Working groups 
ICOS has two active working groups, striving:
 to create an international bibliography of name-study
 to help create an internationally agreed technical terminology for name-study

Congresses 
The International Congress of Onomastic Sciences, which is normally held every three years, is a major academic conference organised on behalf of ICOS by one of its members. The General Assembly of ICOS, which also functions as its business meeting, and at which its officers are elected, is usually held at these congresses. The ordinary business of ICOS is transacted by the elected board of directors.

Until the present, the following congresses have been run:

 Paris, 1938
 Paris, 1947
 Bruxelles [Brussels], 1949
 Uppsala, 1952
 Salamanca, 1955
 München [Munich], 1958
 Firenze [Florence], 1961
 Amsterdam, 1963
 London, 1966
 Wien [Vienna], 1969
 Sofia, 1972
 Bern, 1975
 Kraków, 1978
 Ann Arbor, 1981
 Leipzig, 1984
 Québec, 1987
 Helsinki, 1990
 Trier, 1993
 Aberdeen, 1996
Santiago de Compostela, 1999
Uppsala, 2002
Pisa, 2005
York University, Toronto, 2008
Barcelona, 2011
Glasgow, 2014
Debrecen, 2017
Kraków, 2021 (postponed from 2020 due to the Covid-19 pandemic)
Helsinki, 2024

The proceedings of each congress are available at the ICOS website.

Presidents 
 Professor Hendrik Jozef van de Wijer (Leuven), 1950–1968
 Professor Henri Draye (Leuven), 1969-1983
 Professor Karel Roelandts (Leuven), 1984–1990
 Professor Wilhelm F.H. Nicolaisen (New York / Aberdeen), 1990–1996
 Professor Robert Rentenaar (Amsterdam), 1996–1999
 Professor Isolde Hausner (Vienna), 1999–2002
 Dr. Mats Wahlberg (Uppsala), 2002–2005
 Professor Maria Giovanna Arcamone (Pisa), 2005–2008
 Professor Sheila Embleton (Toronto), 2008–2011
 Professor Carole Hough (Glasgow), 2011–2014
 Dr. Milan Harvalík (Prague), 2014–2017
 Dr. Paula Sjöblom (Turku), 2017–2021
 Dr. Katalin Reszegi (Debrecen), 2021–2024

See also
American Name Society

References

External links

Onoma
Society for Name Studies in Britain and Ireland

International learned societies
Onomastics
Linguistic societies